Rhaesteria is a monotypic genus of flowering plants from the orchid family, Orchidaceae. The sole species is Rhaesteria eggelingii, native to Rwanda and Uganda.

See also 
 List of Orchidaceae genera

References 

Angraecinae
Monotypic Epidendroideae genera
Vandeae genera
Flora of Uganda
Flora of Rwanda
Orchids of Africa